Doctor Strange: Journey into the Mystic Arts is a stage show on board the Disney Magic cruise ship as part of a promotional event titled "Marvel Day at Sea". A version of the show, entitled Ancient Sanctum, is present at the Avengers Campus attraction at the Disney California Adventure park, which opened on June 4, 2021.

Show summary 
Doctor Strange invites the guests to discover the world of the Mystic Arts. Guests will be transported from the Walt Disney Theatre (Disney Cruise Line) to the New York Sanctum, the residence of Doctor Strange. Young apprentices play a special role in the experience, as Doctor Strange calls upon them to learn the fundamentals of the Mystic Arts. After completion of their mystic arts training, the students put their new skills to the test when suddenly an epic battle against Dormammu inside the Dark Dimension ensues.

For the version at Disney California Adventure, the storyline is slightly altered as follows: Recruits are invited to a secluded location right outside the bustling city of Los Angeles. Doctor Strange is inviting recruits to discover the ancient ruins and come see for themselves to learn more about the mystical details revolving around the Orb of Cagliostro.

References

External links 
 Disney California Adventure site

Amusement park attractions introduced in 2021
Walt Disney Parks and Resorts entertainment
Disney Cruise Line
Disney California Adventure
Marvel Comics in amusement parks
Marvel Cinematic Universe amusement rides
Doctor Strange (film series)
Avengers Campus